Lieutenant-Colonel Charles Edward Henry John Mulholland, 4th Baron Dunleath DL (1933–1993) was a politician in Northern Ireland.

Mulholland studied at Eton College and the University of Cambridge. Mulholland succeeded as Baron Dunleath in 1956 and entered the House of Lords.  He was married to Dorinda (15 February 1929-19 March 2022), only daughter of Arthur Percival, on 5 December 1959.

As Lord Dunleath, he became a deputy lieutenant of County Down and the commanding officer (lieutenant-colonel) of the North Irish Horse in the Territorial Army. He was also interested in vintage motoring. In August 1967, he was appointed to the BBC's board of governors, taking over from Richard Pim as governor for Northern Ireland.

In the early 1970s, Dunleath was active in the Ulster Defence Regiment and was an Ulster Unionist Party member. However, he joined the Alliance Party of Northern Ireland, and was elected for the party in North Down at the 1973 Northern Ireland Assembly election.  He held the seat on the Northern Ireland Constitutional Convention.

Dunleath was the only Alliance Party member in the House of Lords. While there, he strongly promoted the Education (Northern Ireland) Act, 1978, which permitted representatives of the Roman Catholic church to take a role in the Protestant-dominated state school system. He also attempted to introduce a bill to liberalise divorce law in Northern Ireland.

Dunleath was chairman of a company which bid for the Independent Television licence for Northern Ireland in 1979.  In order to place the bid, he was required to resign from his party affiliation, and thereafter sat as a crossbencher. However, he was elected at the 1982 Assembly election for the Alliance Party again in North Down.

On Dunleath's death, his title passed to his first cousin Michael Mulholland.

See also
 List of Northern Ireland Members of the House of Lords

References

1933 births
1993 deaths
Alliance Party of Northern Ireland peers
Dunleath 4
BBC Governors
Deputy Lieutenants of Down
Members of the Northern Ireland Assembly 1973–1974
Members of the Northern Ireland Constitutional Convention
Northern Ireland MPAs 1982–1986
Ulster Defence Regiment officers
Ulster Unionist Party hereditary peers
People educated at Eton College
North Irish Horse officers
Alumni of the University of Cambridge